Rushden Parkway railway station is a proposed new railway station to serve the village of Irchester in Northamptonshire, England. It would also serve the nearby towns of Higham Ferrers and Rushden.

The village has not had an active railway station since 1959. The former station building at Rushden has been preserved and now houses Rushden Station Railway Museum. 

Rushden Parkway would be built on the Midland Main Line (which runs about a mile to the west of Rushden) on the site of the former Irchester railway station. In June 2009, the Association of Train Operating Companies (ATOC) commissioned a new report advocating a park and ride station, at the Irchester station site, for Rushden.

See also
 Connecting Communities: Expanding Access to the Rail Network
 Rushden railway station
 Midland Main Line

References

Proposed railway stations in England
Rushden